Elisha Graves Otis (August 3, 1811 – April 8, 1861) was an American industrialist, founder of the Otis Elevator Company, and inventor of a safety device that prevents elevators from falling if the hoisting cable fails.

Early years
Otis was born in Halifax, Vermont, to Stephen Otis and Phoebe Glynn. He moved away from home at the age of 19, eventually settling in Troy, New York, where he lived for five years employed as a wagon driver. In 1834, he married Susan A. Houghton. They had two children, Charles and Norton. Later that year, Otis suffered a terrible case of pneumonia which nearly killed him, but he earned enough money to move his wife and three-year-old son to the Vermont Hills on the Green River. He designed and built his own gristmill, but did not earn enough money from it, so he converted it into a sawmill, yet still did not attract customers. Now having a second son, he started building wagons and carriages, at which he was fairly skilled. His wife later died, leaving Otis with two sons, one age 8 and the other in infancy.

Success and setback
At 34 years old and hoping for a fresh start, he married and moved to Albany, New York. He worked as a doll maker for Otis Tingly. Skilled as a craftsman and tired of working all day to make only twelve toys, he invented and patented a robot turner. It could produce bedsteads four times as fast as could be done manually (about fifty a day). His boss gave him a bonus. Otis then started his own business. At his leased building, he started designing a safety brake that could stop trains instantly and an automatic bread baking oven. He was put out of business when the stream he was using for a power supply was diverted by the city of Albany for its fresh water supply.
In 1851, he first moved to Bergen City, New Jersey (now part of Jersey City), to work as a mechanic, then to Yonkers, New York, as a manager of an abandoned sawmill which he was supposed to convert into a bedstead factory.

Lasting success

At the age of 40, while he was cleaning up the factory, he wondered how he could get all the old debris up to the upper levels of the factory. He had heard of hoisting platforms, but these often broke, and he was unwilling to take the risks. He and his sons, who were also tinkerers, designed their own "safety elevator" and tested it successfully. He initially thought so little of it he neither patented it nor requested a bonus from his superiors for it, nor did he try to sell it. After having made several sales, and after the bedstead factory declined, Otis took the opportunity to make an elevator company out of it, initially called Union Elevator Works and later Otis Brothers & Co.

No orders came to him over the next several months, but soon after, the 1853 New York World's Fair offered a great chance at publicity.  At the New York Crystal Palace, Otis amazed a crowd when he ordered the only rope holding the platform on which he was standing to be cut. The rope was severed by an axeman, and the platform fell only a few inches before coming to a halt. The safety locking mechanism had worked, and people gained greater willingness to ride in traction elevators; these elevators quickly became the type in most common usage and helped make present-day skyscrapers possible.

After the World's Fair, Otis received continuous orders, doubling each year. He developed different types of engines, like a three-way steam valve engine, which could transition the elevator between up and down, and quickly stop it.

Last years and death
In his spare time, he designed and experimented with his old designs of bread-baking ovens and train brakes, and patented a steam plow in 1857, a rotary oven in 1858, and, with Charles, the oscillating steam engine in 1860. The plough was not commercialy successful.  

Otis contracted diphtheria and died on April 8, 1861, at age of 49, He was buried in Oakland Cemetery in Yonkers, NY.

Legacy
An Otis Elevator Company worker coined the term "escalator" to refer to continuous-loop moving staircases that could either ascend or descend. The company was acquired by United Technologies in 1976.
Again in April 2020, Otis Elevators Company is spun off from United technology to be an independent elevator company.
The WWII-era U.S. P.T (Liberty) Boat Elisha Graves Otis was named for him.

References

1811 births
1861 deaths
People from Halifax, Vermont
Otis family
19th-century American inventors
Otis Worldwide
19th-century American businesspeople
Infectious disease deaths in New York (state)
Respiratory disease deaths in New York (state)
Deaths from diphtheria
Transport pioneers